Beauties in Distress is a 1918 American comedy film featuring Oliver Hardy.

Cast
 Billy West
 Oliver Hardy (as Babe Hardy)

See also
 List of American films of 1918
 Oliver Hardy filmography

External links

1918 films
1918 short films
American silent short films
American black-and-white films
1918 comedy films
Silent American comedy films
American comedy short films
1910s American films